Dollond is a small lunar impact crater that is located in the central region of the Moon, to the north of the crater Abulfeda. It was named after British optician John Dollond. Due west of Dollond is Anděl. Dollond is circular and cone shaped, with a tiny  floor at the midpoint of the sloping interior walls.

About 50 kilometers to the northeast of this crater was the landing site of the Apollo 16 mission, the next-to-last of the Apollo expeditions to the Moon.

Satellite craters

By convention these features are identified on lunar maps by placing the letter on the side of the crater midpoint that is closest to Dollond.

The following craters have been renamed by the IAU.
 Dolland C — See Lindsay.

Dollond T is the closest named feature to the Apollo 16 landing site, other than the features that were named by the astronauts (such as North Ray and South Ray craters).

References

 
 
 
 
 
 
 
 
 
 
 

Impact craters on the Moon